Valley Center is a census-designated place (CDP) in northern San Diego County, California. The population was 9,277 at the 2010 census.

History
Valley Center was the site of the capture of the largest California Grizzly Bear in history. In 1866, a grizzly weighing 2,200 pounds was killed at the Lovette house, which has now been demolished. Although the town had been settled in 1845 and homesteaded in 1862 after President Lincoln signed the Homestead Act, it had no formal name until the famous 1866 bear incident. The notoriety surrounding the event gave Valley Center its original name of Bear Valley. The name was subsequently changed to Valley in 1874, to Valley Centre in 1878 and, finally, to Valley Center in 1887. An exhibit of a smaller California Grizzly bear is on display at the Valley Center History Museum.

Geography

Valley Center is home to the Hellhole Canyon Preserve, a 1,907 acre nature reserve that offers 13.5 miles of moderate to advanced trail opportunities.

Climate
According to the Köppen Climate Classification system, Valley Center has a warm-summer Mediterranean climate, abbreviated "Csa" on climate maps.

Demographics

2010
At the 2010 census Valley Center had a population of 9,277. The racial makeup of Valley Center was 2,285 (73.1%) White with 64.0% of the population non-Hispanic whites, 58 (0.9%) African American, 188 (2.0%) Native American, 295 (3.2%) Asian, 16 (0.2%) Pacific Islander, 584 (16.0%) from other races, and 425 (4.6%) from two or more races. 27.8% of the population was Hispanic.

The census reported that 9,243 people (99.6% of the population) lived in households, 27 (0.3%) lived in non-institutionalized group quarters, and 7 (0.1%) were institutionalized.

There were 1,000 households, 1,120 (37.3%) had children under the age of 18 living in them, 1,035 (67.8%) were opposite-sex married couples living together, 43 (7.1%) had a female householder with no husband present, 142 (4.7%) had a male householder with no wife present.  There were 127 (4.2%) unmarried opposite-sex partnerships, and 21 (0.7%) same-sex married couples or partnerships. 239 households (15.4%) were one person and 193 (6.4%) had someone living alone who was 65 or older. The average household size was 3.08.  There were 2,389 families (79.6% of households); the average family size was 3.38.

The age distribution was 1,250 people (24.3%) under the age of 18, 414 people (8.9%) aged 18 to 24, 694 people (20.9%) aged 25 to 44, 1,003 people (33.4%) aged 45 to 64, and 539 people (12.5%) who were 65 or older.  The median age was 42.1 years. For every 100 females, there were 100 males.  For every 100 females age 18 and over, there were 99.4 males.

There were 2,228 housing units at an average density of 117.7 per square mile, of the occupied units 1,739 (80.6%) were owner-occupied and 581 (19.4%) were rented. The homeowner vacancy rate was 1.7%; the rental vacancy rate was 2.8%.  2,364 people (79.4% of the population) lived in owner-occupied housing units and 1,879 people (20.3%) lived in rental housing units.

2000
At the 2000 census there were 1,323 people, 415 households, and 719 families in the CDP. The population density was 59.1 inhabitants per square mile (96.6/km). The racial makeup of the CDP was 85.69% White, 0.52% African American, 2.84% Native American, 1.35% Asian, 0.19% Pacific Islander, 6.45% from other races, and 2.96% from two or more races.
Of the 415 households 38.8% had children under the age of 18 living with them, 68.4% were married couples living together, 6.7% had a female householder with no husband present, and 20.5% were non-families. 15.6% of households were one person and 6.1% were one person aged 65 or older.  The average household size was 3.01 and the average family size was 3.33.

The age distribution was 29.6% under the age of 18, 6.5% from 18 to 24, 25.2% from 25 to 44, 27.4% from 45 to 64, and 11.4% 65 or older.  The median age was 39 years. For every 100 females, there were 102.2 males.  For every 100 females age 18 and over, there were 101.1 males.

The median household income was $64,649 and the median family income  was $68,388. Males had a median income of $50,440 versus $35,199 for females. The per capita income for the CDP was $24,071.  About 5.8% of families and 3.6% of the population were below the poverty line, including 5.7% of those under age 18 and 10.6% of those age 65 or over.

Government

Valley Center also serves as the seat of the tribal governments of the Rincon Band of Luiseño Indians and the San Pasqual Band of Diegueno Mission Indians reservations, east of the CDP area.

Community 

Valley Center is a small community in a rural area. The community is largely based on agriculture and farming with a few gated communities. Historically, the growth of Valley Center has been slowed by lower densities including a minimum of  being required for most parcels.

Some changes in the community can be attributed to the expansion of Indian casinos in the area. There are currently two major casinos in the vicinity of Valley Center: Harrah's Resort Southern California and Valley View. Both were opened in 2001–02, bringing traffic and jobs to what used to be an out-of-the-way agricultural town. High traffic necessitated highway improvements, partially paid by casino contributions.

Despite these changes, there are only a few chain stores in the community (Rite Aid, Tractor Supply Company); residents do their shopping in smaller "mom and pop" stores, and drive either to Escondido or Temecula to shop at big-box stores.

The Valley Center History Museum is located on Cole Grade Road in the Valley Center Library complex. The museum displays historical photographs and artifacts from Valley Center and the surrounding area. It is a registered charity and staffed entirely by volunteers.

The museum was founded in 2003 by the Valley Center Historical Society. In 2015, it expanded by 50 percent, adding an extra wing to accommodate a historic stagecoach which was built in 1848 and served as a Civil war ambulance, provided local transportation, and was featured in a number of Western motion pictures. Its other centerpiece exhibit is a taxidermy mount of a now-extinct California Grizzly Bear. Other exhibits include memorabilia and photographs from famous people who have lived or spent time in the area such as John Wayne, Fred Astaire, Steve Reeves, Randolph Scott, June Allyson and Dick Powell.

Memorial weekend event 
On Memorial Day weekend, the town celebrates fallen veterans at the Valley Center Stampede Rodeo and Festival 

The Stampede Rodeo was originally organized by Valley Center Western Days from 2002 to 2005, the event was sponsored by numerous non-profits including the Valley Center Optimist Club, but recently became sanctioned by the Professional Rodeo Cowboys association, and all proceeds go back to the youth of the Valley Center community through club donations and scholarships.  In 2018, the Valley Center Stampede Rodeo became sanctioned by the Professional Rodeo Cowboys Association, becoming the first professional, non-profit rodeo in Valley Center. The Valley Center Stampede Rodeo supports several youth associations within the community, including the Valley Center Stampede Rodeo Queens. In 2018, Miss Valley Center Stampede Rodeo Madison Wagner represented Valley Center at the state-level pageant for the first time, winning the crown on her first attempt and becoming the first Valley Center Stampede Rodeo Queen to be crowned Miss Rodeo California.

Independence weekend events 
On Independence Day weekend, the town celebrates their western heritage and the United States with the Valley Center Western Days Parade and Country Fair. Originally a Memorial weekend event, the organization rescheduled the event to Independence Day weekend due to San Diego officials prohibiting gatherings of 50 or more people, then the March 19, 2020 stay-at-home order issued by the Governor of California Gavin Newsom.

The annual event began as the Valley Center County Fair (1950), then became Western Week (1963), Western Days Country Festival (1966), Country Fair (1967), Western Days (1968), and Valley Center Western Days (1980). The Western Days Parade was added in 1970. In 2002, a rodeo was added known as bulls and barrels, but later became the Valley Center Stampede Rodeo the next year. The Stampede Rodeo separated from Western Days in 2017.

In 2017, the non-profit Valley Center Western Days, Inc. was formed to produce the event. In 2020, the event will celebrate its 70th anniversary.

Agriculture 
Traditionally, the town and the surrounding areas have largely been dedicated to agricultural uses.  Various commercial crops include oranges, lemons, and avocados.  More recently farmers have taken up other crops, including ornamental floral products such as lavender.  Additionally, there is a thriving animal farming industry including egg-producing hens and llamas.

Notable people
June Allyson, actress
Fred Astaire, actor/dancer
Glen Bell, founded Taco Bell chain
Fred Biletnikoff, former Oakland Raiders wide receiver
Louis Bromfield, Author
Daniel Brunskill, NFL offensive tackle
 J.J. Cale, musician
 Gary Cooper, actor
Kevin Craft, former UCLA quarterback
Billy Cundiff, NFL kicker
John DeLorean, auto tycoon
Gary Garrison, former San Diego Chargers football player
Kirby Grant, actor and rancher
Jack Haley, actor, the Tin Man in The Wizard of Oz
Charles Hatfield, rainmaker
Mike Leake, MLB pitcher
Katie Leclerc, actress
 Denise Mueller-Korenek, cyclist, world speed record holder
Merle Oberon, actress
Dick Powell, actor
Steve Reeves, Hercules actor
Trevor Reilly, former NFL linebacker, defensive lineman
Irene Ryan, actress, Granny on The Beverly Hillbillies
Sean Salisbury, former NFL quarterback, television sports analyst
Randolph Scott, actor
John Wayne, actor
Mae West, actress
Carol Williams, international concert organist and San Diego civic organist since 2001
Sam Zimbalist, movie producer

References

External links
 Valley Center Chamber of Commerce

 
Census-designated places in San Diego County, California
North County (San Diego County)
San Diego metropolitan area
Census-designated places in California